Tehran Von Ghasri, or simply Tehran Ghasri, professionally known as Tehran formerly Tehran SoParvaz, is an American international comedian, actor, host, television and radio personality, entertainer of African-American and Persian descent. Tehran was raised in Washington D.C. and surrounding Washington Metropolitan Area, where he began his career hosting on television and curating events. Tehran is multilingual, performing comedy in Persian, mixed Arabic, some Hebrew, French, and primarily English.

Early life
Tehran Von Ghasri was born in Washington D.C. to an Iranian immigrant father and African-American mother, who met in the U.S.A. in college. He was named after Tehran, the capital of Iran. His parents chose the name "Tehran" as a reminder of his Persian roots while the name sounded African American as well. His name was subject to controversy in Islamic Republic of Iran courts. On attempting to receive Iran status, courts in Iran ruled the use of "Tehran", as a name, as counter to the Islamic Republic regime. Tehran's father and family fought legally in court for Tehran to retain the name for Iran documentation. Tehran was the first Iranian named as such. The name had no usage in records before in Iran.

Tehran Von Ghasri's family is multicultural and multi-religious. His religious background include Muslim, Zoroastrian, Christian, and Jewish heritage. His maternal grandmother was Mizrahi Jewish of nubian Egyptian descent, his maternal grandfather was non-practicing Baptist from a prominent African American family. His paternal grandfather was Muslim, while his paternal grandmother was a practicing Zoroastrian. Each grandparent felt a need to convey their heritage to Tehran as a child. As a result, growing up Tehran had many different religious ceremonies including a bar mitzvah. Tehran is well disciplined and educated in all of his distinct cultural heritages, religious, and diverse ethnic backgrounds and speaks on them in and media and comedy frequently. Tehran speaks several languages including Persian, which he also reads and writes, fluently.

Due to his immigrant and proud minority upbringing, education played a large part of Tehran's life. An avid basketball player in high school recruited for college, Tehran had top grades and SAT score in high school. Tehran double majored in a Bachelor of Arts program in International Politics and Communication, a Masters in Econ, before attending law school for his J.D. Tehran graduated Magna Cum Laude with aspirations of going into show business as a manager, agent, or executive. Tehran decided to go into comedy his last year of law school after watching comedian Mike E. Winfield on TV and then performing on stage with fellow comedians Max Amini and Maz Jobrani. He loved the feeling of making an audience of people laugh, while speaking his truth. On advice from Maz Jobrani and Dave Chappelle, Tehran moved to Los Angeles and began at the Laugh Factory.  

Tehran has always been involved in social activism, especially in regards to Human Rights, African American rights in the U.S.A., and freedoms in Iran. Tehran often mixes his social activism with his comedy on stage.

Career 
In a television show launched by VOA Persian which called "Minutes With Max Amini", he revealed his long-time friendship with Max Amini and said that Amini was his first motivator to be a comedian. followed by a performance by Maz Jobrani at George Washington University which Maz encouraged him to move to Los Angeles and pursue comedy full time. Tehran has a J.D. degree and holds degrees in international politics, economics from George Mason University. Tehran went viral for his story being told on VOA favorite, Parazit.

Tehran has hosted his own radio and television shows on Rangarang and Tapesh satellite television, both of them are US-based Persian language television channels. Tehran rose to populartiy in the Iranian diaspora after begin featured in the premier episode of Parazit on VOA. After becoming very popular in the Iranian community and diaspora, Tehran has branched out and crossed over into the American and International markets. After being a guest, Tehran became a main host and daily contributo on Take Part Live, the prime daily social commentary talk show on Pivot (TV Network). Tehran performs stand-up comedy in venues all over the world, and is a favorite at The World Famous Laugh Factory in Los Angeles. Tehran created and hosts Comedy Bazaar, the longest running Middle Eastern comedy show, as well as the inclusive Tehran Thursday. Both are staple shows at the Laugh Factory. 

In 2017, he was a panelist on several season 4 episodes of the AfterBuzz TV aftershow podcast for the American television series Agents of S.H.I.E.L.D..

Tehran has been in several film projects including Dane Cook American Typecast, the Sean Stone directed Fury of the Fist and the Golden Fleece, and featured in Maz Jobrani project Jimmy Vestvood. Tehran has also been a main host on Fox SoMe panel show, daily contributor on Take Part Live, and regular on Fox Soul. Tehran's comedy style has been noted as very unique with elements of Dave Chappelle meets Maz Jobrani, whom he often tours with. Tehran has produced and taken part in many shows focused on bringing people together and world peace, most notably Comedy 4 Peace aimed at united in the Middle East with focuses on Israel and Palestinian relations with comedian Erik Angel. Tehran cites his personal journey and cultural connections as inspirations for his comedy seeking to unite people through laughter.

Filmography

Film

Television

Other Work

See also 

List of Iranian Americans
Max Amini
Maz Jobrani
Omid Djalili
Shappi Khorsandi

References

External links
 

21st-century American comedians
American stand-up comedians
American comedians of Iranian descent
American male television actors
American male film actors
George Mason University alumni
Actors of Iranian descent
Living people
Year of birth missing (living people)
American people of Iranian-African descent
21st-century African-American people